António Moreira Barbosa de Melo, GColL (2 November 1932 – 7 September 2016) was a Portuguese lawyer, politician, and parliamentarian on several occasions.

Career
de Melo was born in Penafiel, Lagares in 1932. He graduated as a Licentiate and a Doctorate in Law from the Faculty of Law of the University of Coimbra, where he became an investigator and a Cathedratic Professor.

He was one of the founders of the then Popular Democratic Party together with Francisco Sá Carneiro, Francisco Pinto Balsemão, Joaquim Magalhães Mota, Carlos Mota Pinto, João Bosco Mota Amaral, Alberto João Jardim and António Marques Mendes, in which party he exercised many offices at its national organs.

He integrated the Commission to the Elaboration of the Electoral Law for the Constituent Assembly in 1974, in which he was also a Deputy, as he was also at the Assembly of the Republic from 1976 to 1977 and from 1991 to 1999.

He was elected the 9th President of the Assembly of the Republic during the 6th legislature (7 November 1991 - 26 October 1995). He was also a member of the Portuguese Council of State as the President of the Assembly of the Republic during the same period. de Melo died on 7 September 2016 in Coimbra.

References

 Os Presidentes do Parlamento (Presidents of the Portuguese Parliament), Assembly of the Republic

1932 births
People from Penafiel
2016 deaths
Presidents of the Assembly of the Republic (Portugal)
Social Democratic Party (Portugal) politicians